Akbar Davud-e Qeshlaqi (also Romanized as Akbar Dāvūd-e Qeshlāqī; also known as Akbar Dāvūd and Dāvūd Qeshlāqī) is a village in Anjirlu Rural District, in the Central District of Bileh Savar County, Ardabil Province, Iran. At the 2006 census, its population was 383, in 68 families.

References 

Towns and villages in Bileh Savar County